Sarmiento Lake is a lake located in Torres del Paine National Park, in the Magallanes Region of southern Chile. It is named after Spanish explorer Pedro Sarmiento de Gamboa, and gives its name to one of the areas in the National Park Torres del Paine.  Its edge is marked by extensive calcium carbonate "Thrombolites" deposits, possibly from hydrothermal activity in the lake.

See also
 Salto Grande

References

External links

Sarmiento
Lakes of Magallanes Region
Torres del Paine National Park